This article lists the Labour Party's election results from the 1929 United Kingdom general election until 1945, including by-elections.

All candidates were sponsored, in some cases by the Divisional Labour Party (noted as "Constituency").

Summary of general election performance

Sponsorship of candidates

Election results

1929 general election

Gill in Blackburn, Brothers in Bolton, Raynes in Derby, Marcus in Dundee, Smith in Norwich, Wilson in Oldham, Morley in Southampton and Smith in Sunderland were elected by taking second place in a two-seat constituency.

By-elections, 1929–1931

1931 general election

By-elections, 1931–1935

1935 general election

By-elections, 1935–1945

References

Election results by party in the United Kingdom
Results 1929